Nicholas "Nick" Park  (born 8 April 1999) is an English field hockey player who plays as a midfielder for Surbiton and the England and Great Britain national teams.

Club career
Park plays club hockey in the Men's England Hockey League Premier Division for Surbiton.

He has also played for Beeston and Reading.

International career
He made his senior England debut against Spain on 4 February 2022.

References

External links

Profile on England Hockey

1999 births
Living people
English male field hockey players
Male field hockey midfielders
Men's England Hockey League players
Surbiton Hockey Club players
Beeston Hockey Club players
Reading Hockey Club players
2023 Men's FIH Hockey World Cup players